K-9 and Company is a one-episode television pilot, for a proposed 1981 television spin-off of the British science fiction television series Doctor Who. It features former series regulars Sarah Jane Smith, an investigative journalist played by Elisabeth Sladen, and K9, a robotic dog voiced by John Leeson. Both characters had been companions of the Fourth Doctor, but they had not appeared together before. The single episode, "A Girl's Best Friend", was broadcast by BBC1 as a Christmas special on 28 December 1981, but was not taken up for a continuing series.

"A Girl's Best Friend" is set in the fictional English village of Moreton Harwood in 1981. In the programme, Sarah and K9 investigate the disappearance of Brendan Richards (Ian Sears), the ward of Sarah's Aunt Lavinia (Mary Wimbush), in the wake of increasing reports of witchcraft.

Under a different production team, the overall concept of a Sarah Jane and K9 series did eventually come to fruition: The Sarah Jane Adventures (2007–2011), featuring both of these key characters and actors (though K9 and Leeson only appear in some episodes).

Programme origins
The programme has its roots firmly in the desire of Doctor Who producer John Nathan-Turner to get Elisabeth Sladen back into the TARDIS. He wanted her to have the contract eventually awarded to Janet Fielding in late 1980. John Nathan-Turner's preferred plan for the transition from Baker to Davison was to have Sarah Jane be along for the ride from Logopolis to the second story of series 19. However, Sladen had no interest in returning simply to reprise a role and function identical to the one she had left years before.

Meanwhile, Nathan-Turner was trying to figure out what to do about K9. The robot dog was very popular among children but was difficult to deal with technically and Nathan-Turner felt that it made the TARDIS crew almost overwhelmingly formidable. He decided that a child-orientated spin-off series with K9 might be just the thing. However, such a series would require a human as the lead, and his prime candidate for this role was Sladen. He pitched the part to the actress as a departure from what she had previously done: she would be returning as Sarah Jane Smith, but she would do so as the heroine and not just a sidekick. This offer Sladen accepted.

"A Girl's Best Friend"

Plot
Sarah Jane Smith visits her Aunt Lavinia, who was occasionally mentioned but never seen in Doctor Who. When she arrives at her aunt's house, though, she finds that her learned relative has left early for a lecture tour in America, Christmas notwithstanding. Sarah is thus left disappointed by the prospect of another holiday without family. Lavinia's ward, Brendan Richards, breaks her moment of reflection on her aunt's sudden disappearance. After picking him up from the railway station, they return to the house and discover a large crate that has been waiting for Sarah for a number of years. When they open it, they discover a mechanical dog named K9. Upon activation, it tells Sarah that it is a gift from the Doctor.

Brendan's curiosity about K9 is matched only by Sarah's renewed concern over Lavinia's absence. They thus split up and follow their new-found obsessions. Sarah goes into town to question the locals, and Brendan stays behind to test the capabilities of Sarah's new "pet". In town, Sarah discovers that Lavinia has become disliked by some because of her blunt letters to the local newspaper editors about a growing practice of witchcraft in the area. Brendan, meanwhile, is attacked while using K9 to analyse soil samples in Lavinia's garden. His attackers, George Tracey and his son, Peter, are tied into the local coven. George Tracey flees before Brendan can get a good look at him, however K9 uses his laser gun to stun Peter before setting off in pursuit of George.  Peter is pinioned and interrogated by Brendan, but makes his escape when Brendan goes outside to investigate a crashing sound which turns out to be the accidental destruction of a greenhouse by K9 in his pursuit of the elder Tracey.

Since Tracey is actually Lavinia's gardener, he is naturally called in the next morning to investigate the damage K9's pursuit of him caused to the greenhouse. After Brendan attempts to brag about the pH balance of the soil, Tracey sharply comments that gardening is more about respect for nature than scientific theory. Otherwise, though, he doesn't betray his more sinister intent towards Brendan. Later that night, he sends his son out to kidnap the sleeping Brendan from the house.

This time, Brendan's attacker is successful, stealing him out from under Sarah, who is elsewhere in the house, reading up on the local practice of witchcraft.

Sarah is now increasingly suspicious of Tracey, believing he would have the opportunity to commit the crime, even if she can't yet put her finger on the motive. She therefore finds a way to hide K9 in Tracey's house. K9 quietly monitors the household, until he eventually listens in on a conversation that implicates Tracey as a member of a coven. He also discovers that Tracey intends to kill Brendan in an act of ritual murder.

When Tracey leaves his cottage, Sarah is able to retrieve K9, who alerts his new mistress to the impending crime. She has no way to enlist the aid of the local police or, really anyone else in the town, because she can't substantiate her claim of overhearing the conversation without also then having to explain who and what the anachronistic K9 actually is.

Realising that she and K9 are effectively on their own, she tries to figure out how to stop the sacrifice. Her first order of business is determining the when of it. Using Lavinia's books on witchcraft, she and K9 deduce it must occur at midnight on the winter solstice, now just a few short hours away. The where of it is more elusive, however, causing the duo to drive around the shire looking at all the churches. As the last few minutes before midnight tick away, they finally realise that there's an abandoned chapel on Lavinia's property. Rushing home, K9 and Sarah are briefly upset at missing something that was right under their noses all along.

They arrive just in time for K9 to use his blaster to stop the coven's Priest and Priestess from plunging a knife into Brendan's chest. Now stunned, the group's ringleaders are easily apprehended by the police.

Finally able to celebrate Christmas, Sarah receives a call from her Aunt Lavinia. She's surprised that Sarah was worried about her, since she left instructions for her business partner to send Sarah a cable. As he turned out to be the High Priest of the coven, Sarah merely laughs and tells her aunt that she has a story to tell her about why that message never reached her. Meanwhile, K9 tries to connect with the human holiday in his own way, teaching himself to sing "We Wish You a Merry Christmas".

Production

Cast notes
Bill Fraser previously appeared with Tom Baker and K9 Mark II in the Doctor Who story Meglos in 1980 and Colin Jeavons played Damon in the Patrick Troughton serial The Underwater Menace in 1967.

Theme music
Many Doctor Who fans remember "A Girl's Best Friend" most clearly for its electronic theme music, composed by Fiachra Trench. The music was intended to be an orchestral score, but was instead arranged directly from an electronic demonstration arrangement by Peter Howell (who also arranged the 1980s version of the Doctor Who theme music)

Broadcast and production
The viewing figures for the pilot were strong, achieving a viewership of about 8.4 million Britons on its première. This meant that it attracted more viewers than the average episode of Doctor Who during John Nathan-Turner's era as producer. It was even more popular than the other seasonal special of the era, The Five Doctors, which posted a rating of 7.7.

Despite these above-average ratings, the show did not go to series. The proximate cause for this was a changeover in channel controllers at BBC One; Bill Cotton, who had approved the pilot, vacated his position soon thereafter. He was replaced by Alan Hart, who simply disliked the idea and the resulting product. Further episodes were therefore not commissioned. The show was repeated once on BBC2 during the Christmas period of 1982.

Reception
The pilot attracted 8.4 million viewers on its original broadcast.

In Doctor Who Magazine's The Mighty 200 fans gave K-9 and Company 51.55% likeness. The title sequence came first in TV's Top 5 worst title sequences as part of David Walliams' Awfully Good TV.

Commercial releases

In print

A novelisation of "A Girl's Best Friend" was released under the title K-9 and Company, in October 1987, as the last of The Companions of Doctor Who series by Target Books.

Home media
K-9 and Company was originally released on VHS on 7 August 1995 by BBC Worldwide. It was then released onto DVD 16 June 2008 as a double pack with K-9's first Doctor Who story The Invisible Enemy by 2entertain. It was released again in March 2019 as part of the Season 18 Blu-Ray Box set.

K-9 and Company was re-released on DVD by 2entertain on 25 October 2010, since then the BBC have it released it via the Doctor Who YouTube Channel on 1 December 2012. It is no longer available 

It was included in the Doctor Who: the Collection season 18 as an extra remastered to HD.

References

External links
 
K-9 and Company theme music

New series info from Outpost Gallifrey

Target novelisation

Doctor Who serials novelised by Terence Dudley
Doctor Who spin-offs
Television pilots not picked up as a series
BBC Television shows
1981 television specials
Fiction set in 1981
Christmas television specials
Television series created by John Nathan-Turner
Television episodes about witchcraft